Thomas Kilgore Jr. was a prominent clergyman, community leader, and human rights activist. He helped organize the March on Washington.

Biography
Kilgore was born in Woodruff, South Carolina. While a freshman at Morehouse College in Atlanta, he attended Ebeneezer Baptist Church, which was headed by the Reverend A. D. Williams, the maternal grandfather of Martin Luther King Jr. It was through this association that he got to know the King family.  He first met Martin Luther King when he was only  years old.

When the Southern Christian Leadership Conference (SCLC) was founded in the late 1950s, he managed their New York office. In 1963, he helped organize the March on Washington. Also in 1963, Kilgore became pastor of Second Baptist Church, the oldest black Baptist church in Los Angeles and established the first chapter of SCLC west of the Rockies. He led Second Baptist Church until his retirement in 1985.

Kilgore died in Los Angeles on February 4, 1998. He was 84 years old.

References

1913 births
1998 deaths
African-American activists
20th-century Baptist ministers from the United States
Activists for African-American civil rights
Activists from Georgia (U.S. state)
Activists from South Carolina
African-American Baptist ministers
African-American theologians
American human rights activists
American humanitarians
American anti-racism activists
Montgomery bus boycott
Morehouse College alumni
Nonviolence advocates
People from Atlanta
Baptists from Georgia (U.S. state)
Baptists from South Carolina
Clergy from Atlanta